Ilkeston Town F.C. was an English association football club based in Ilkeston, Derbyshire.

History
The club was formed in 1882.

They competed in the Midland Football League and FA Cup for many years before disbanding in 1903, the club's best season being runners-up in 1898-99, one point off champions Doncaster Rovers.

A new Ilkeston Town F.C. club was formed in 1945.

Records
Best FA Cup performance: 5th Qualifying Round, 1896–97, 1897–98

References

Defunct football clubs in Derbyshire
Ilkeston
1880s establishments in England
1903 disestablishments in England
Association football clubs disestablished in 1903
Defunct football clubs in England
Association football clubs established in 1882